Carbon capture and utilization (CCU) is the process of capturing carbon dioxide (CO2) to be recycled for further usage. Carbon capture and utilization may offer a response to the global challenge of significantly reducing greenhouse gas emissions from major stationary (industrial) emitters. CCU differs from carbon capture and storage (CCS) in that CCU does not aim nor result in permanent geological storage of carbon dioxide. Instead, CCU aims to convert the captured carbon dioxide into more valuable substances or products; such as plastics, concrete or biofuel; while retaining the carbon neutrality of the production processes.

Captured CO2 can be converted to several products: one group being alcohols, such as methanol, to  use as biofuels and other alternative and renewable sources of energy. Other commercial products include plastics, concrete and reactants for various chemical synthesis. 

Although CCU does not result in a net carbon positive to the atmosphere, there are several important considerations to be taken into account. Because CO2 is a thermodynamically stable form of carbon manufacturing products from it is energy intensive. The availability of other raw materials to create a product should also be considered before investing in CCU.

Considering the different potential options for capture and utilization, research suggests that those involving chemicals, fuels and microalgae have limited potential for  removal, while those that involve construction materials and agricultural use can be more effective.

The profitability of CCU depends partly on the carbon price of CO2 being released into the atmosphere.

Sources of carbon 
CO2 is typically captured from fixed point sources in heavy industry such as petrochemical plants. CO2 captured from these exhaust stream itself varies in concentration. A typical coal power plant will have 10-12% CO2 concentration in its flue gas exhaust stream. A biofuel refinery produces a high purity (99%) of CO2 with small amount of impurities such as water and ethanol. The separation process itself can be performed through separation processes such as absorption, adsorption, or membranes.

Another possible source of capture in CCU process involves the use of plantation. The idea originates from the observation in the Keeling curve that the CO2 level in the atmosphere undergoes annual variation of approximately 5 ppm (parts per million), which is attributed to the seasonal change of vegetation and difference in land mass between the northern and southern hemisphere. However, the CO2 sequestered by the plants will be returned to the atmosphere when the plants die. Thus, it is proposed to plant crops with C4 photosynthesis, given its rapid growth and high carbon capture rate, and then to process the biomass for applications such as biochar that will be stored in the soil permanently.

Examples of technology and application

CO2 electrolysis 

CO2 electroreduction to a variety of value-added products has been under development for many years. Some major targets are formate, oxalate, and methanol, as electrochemical formation of these products from CO2 would constitute a very environmentally sustainable practice.
For example, CO2 can be captured and converted to carbon-neutral fuels in an aqueous catalysis process. It is possible to convert CO2 in this way directly to ethanol, which can then be upgraded to gasoline and jet fuel.

Carbon-neutral fuel 
A carbon-neutral fuel can be synthesized by using the captured CO2 from the atmosphere as the main hydrocarbon source. The fuel is then combusted and CO2, as the byproduct of the combustion process, is released back into the air. In this process, there is no net carbon dioxide released or removed from the atmosphere, hence the name carbon-neutral fuel.

Methanol fuel 
A proven process to produce a hydrocarbon is to make methanol. Traditionally, methanol is produced from natural gas. Based on this fact the idea of a methanol economy was born.

Methanol, or methyl alcohol, is the simplest member of the family of alcohol organic compound with a chemical formula of CH3OH. Methanol fuel can be manufactured using the captured carbon dioxide while performing the production with renewable energy. Consequently, methanol fuel has been considered as an alternative to fossil fuels in power generation for achieving a carbon-neutral sustainability. Carbon Recycling International, a company with production facility in Grindavik, Iceland, markets such Emission-to-Liquid renewable high octane methanol fuel with current 4,000 tonne/year production capacity.

Chemical synthesis 
As a highly desirable C1 (one-carbon) chemical feedstock, CO2 captured previously can be converted to a diverse range of products. Some of these products include: polycarbonates (via Zinc based catalyst) or other organic products such as acetic acid, urea, and PVC. Currently 75% (112 million tons) of urea production, 2% (2 million tons) of methanol production, 43% (30 thousand tons) of salicylic acid production, and 50% (40 thousand tons) of cyclic carbonates production utilize CO2 as a feedstock. Chemical synthesis is not a permanent storage/utilization of CO2, as aliphatic (straight chain) compounds may degrade and release CO2 back to the atmosphere as early as 6 months. As the use of fossil fuels decreases, removing carbon dioxide from the air is increasingly seen as a way to stop the long-term accumulation of greenhouse gases in the atmosphere. Carbon emissions and storage coupled with reductions in fossil fuel use are known as "negative emissions".

Carbon dioxide also could be used in chemoenzymatic processes to synthesize starch without cells. In nature starch is usually synthesised within cells from carbon dioxide via photosynthesis. In cell-free synthesis, carbon dioxide is reduced to methanol with an inorganic catalyst; then methanol is converted to three carbon sugar units. The three carbon sugar units will be converted to six carbon sugar units and finally polymerize into starch. Compared to photosynthesis, which involves sixty biochemical reactions, cell-free synthesis needs eleven steps. This means cell-free synthesis can be faster than photosynthesis. The synthesis rate is 8.5 times that of corn starch, and the absorbance rate of carbon dioxide is more efficient than that of plants.  This method is still developing, and the first publication on the topic was only in 2021, so there are still some problems. First, this method needs significant energy inputs, just as plants need sunlight. If the electricity used is not produced cleanly, large carbon dioxide emissions will still result. Moreover, high costs present a barrier to commercialisation.

Enhanced oil recovery (EOR) 

In EOR, the captured CO2 is injected into depleted oil fields with the goal to increase the amount of oil to be extracted by the wells. This method is proven to increase oil output by 5-40%.

Enhanced gas recovery (EGR) 
Carbon Sequestration with Enhanced Gas Recovery (CSEGR) is a process in which CO2 is injected deep in the gas reservoir and as a result, at the gas wells which are some distance away, methane (CH4) is produced. This process by active injection of CO2 causes repressurization and methane displacement, so that the gas recovery becomes enhanced compared to water-drive or depletion-drive operations.

Carbon mineralization 

Carbon dioxide from sources such as flue gas are reacted with minerals such as magnesium oxide and calcium oxide to form stable solid carbonates. These minerals can be mined, or existing brine and waste industrial minerals (including slag) can be reused.  The carbonates produced can be used for construction, consumer products, and as an alternative for carbon capture and sequestration (CCS).

Approximately 1 tonne of CO2 is removed from the air for every 3.7 tonnes of mineral carbonate produced.

Biofuel from microalgae 

A study has suggested that microalgae can be used as an alternative source of energy. A pond of microalgae is fed with a source of carbon dioxide such as flue gas, and the microalgae is then allowed to proliferate. The algae is then harvested and the biomass obtained is then converted to biofuel. About 1.8 tonnes of CO2 can be removed from the air per 1 tonne of dry algal biomass produced, though this number actually varies depending on the species. The CO2 captured will be stored non-permanently as the biofuel produced will then be combusted and the CO2 will be released back into the air. However, the CO2 released was first captured from the atmosphere and releasing it back into the air makes the fuel a carbon-neutral fuel. This technology is not mature yet.

Agriculture 

An approach that is also proposed as a climate change mitigation effort is to perform plant-based carbon capture. The resulting biomass can then be used for fuel, while the biochar byproduct is then utilized for applications in agriculture as soil-enhancer. Cool Planet is a private company with an R&D plant in Camarillo, California, performed development of biochar for agricultural applications and claimed that their product can increase crops yield by 12.3% and three-fold return of investment via improvement of soil health and nutrient retention. However, the claims on the efficacy of plant-based carbon capture for climate change mitigation has received a fair amount of skepticism.

Environmental impacts 
16 life cycle environmental impact analyses have been done to assess the impacts of four main CCU technologies against conventional CCS: Chemical synthesis, carbon mineralization, biodiesel production, as well as Enhanced Oil Recovery (EOR). These technologies were assessed based on 10 Life-cycle assessment (LCA) impacts such as: acidification potential, eutrophication potential, global warming potential, and ozone depletion potential. The conclusion from the 16 different models was that chemical synthesis has the highest global warming potential (216 times that of CCS) while enhanced oil recovery has the least global warming potential (1.8 times that of CCS).

See also 
 
Carbon capture and storage
Climate change mitigation
Carbon neutral fuel
Carbon sequestration
Greenhouse gas removal
List of energy topics
Low-carbon economy
Solar Foods Ltd.

References

Further reading 

 
 
New route to carbon-neutral fuels from carbon dioxide discovered by Stanford-DTU team

Carbon dioxide
 
Climate engineering
Emerging technologies
Environmental technology
Sustainability